The 2005 World Touring Car Championship was the second season of World Touring Car Championship motor racing, and the first since 1987. It featured the 2005 FIA World Touring Car Championship which was contested over a ten event, twenty race series which commenced on 10 April and ended on 20 November. The championship was open to Super 2000 cars, Diesel 2000 cars and Super Production cars as defined by the FIA. Andy Priaulx won the Drivers' Championship and BMW won the Manufacturers' title.

Organised by KSO, a subsidiary of Eurosport, the championship was an evolution of the former European Touring Car Championship, elevated to World Championship status by the FIA for 2005 with the introduction of races outside Europe. The European title was given to the new European Touring Car Cup, a one-off event.

Teams and drivers
According to 2005 Entry List.

Calendar

The championship was contested over ten events, each featuring two 50 kilometre races. The starting grid order for the first race at each event was determined by the results of qualifying and that of the second race by the results of the first race, but with the top eight cars in reverse order.

Results and standings

Races

Standings

Drivers' Championship

Bold – Pole
Italics – Fastest Lap

† — Drivers did not finish the race, but were classified as they completed over 90% of the race distance.

Drivers' Championship points were awarded on a 10–8–6–5–4–3–2–1 basis to first eight finishers at each race.

Note: Drivers who did not score points during the season were not classified into Drivers' Championship positions.

Manufacturers' Championship

The Manufacturers' title was awarded to the manufacturer which had scored the highest number of points, taking into account all the results obtained by the best two cars classified per manufacturer in each race. All the other cars of that same manufacturer were considered invisible as far as scoring points was concerned. Points were awarded on a 10–8–6–5–4–3–2–1 basis for each race.

Michelin Independents' Trophy

Championship promoter KSO organised the Michelin Independent Drivers' Trophy within the 2005 FIA World Touring Car Championship. A driver's eligibility to compete for the Trophy was determined exclusively by KSO, taking into consideration various criteria relating to the team, driver and car.  Points were awarded to eligible drivers on a 10–8–6–5–4–3–2–1 basis for races 1 to 18 and on a 20–16–12–10–8–6–4–2 basis for races 19 & 20.

Michelin Teams' Trophy

Championship promoter KSO organised the Michelin Teams' Trophy within the 2005 FIA World Touring Car Championship. All teams participating in the Championship were eligible to score points towards the Trophy, however points were only awarded for the two best classified cars of each team, providing they are driven by drivers classified by KSO as Independent Drivers. Any other cars of that same team were invisible as far as point scoring was concerned. Points towards the Michelin Teams' Trophy were awarded on a 10–8–6–5–4–3–2–1 basis at all races.

Notes

References

External links
 FIA World Touring Car Championship official website
 Specific Regulations for Modified Production Cars on Circuits (Super-2000), www.fia.com via web.archive.org